The Turan Tovuz 2011–12 season is Turan Tovuz's nineteenth Azerbaijan Premier League season. They finished the regular season in 12th place, meaning they took part in the Relegation group. They finished this group in 5th place, 11th over the whole league, and were put into the Relegation play-offs against FK Karvan. However this match didn't take place due to a decision by the Association of Football Federations of Azerbaijan about licensing, deciding that no clubs from the First Division would be promoted. This meant that Turan Tovuz kept their place for the 2012–13 Azerbaijan Premier League season.

Squad

Transfers

Summer

In:

Out:

Winter

In:

Out:

Competitions

Azerbaijan Premier League

Results summary

Results by round

Results

League table

Azerbaijan Premier League Relegation Group

Results

Table

2011-12 Azerbaijan Cup Results

Notes
Match Abandoned after Turan refused to restart the game after conceding a disputed goal, Match awarded 3-0

Squad statistics

Appearances and goals

|-
|colspan="14"|Players who appeared for Turan Tovuz who left during the season:

|}

Goal scorers

Disciplinary record

External links 
 Turan Tovuz at Soccerway.com

Turan Tovuz
Turan-Tovuz IK seasons